David Irvine may refer to:
David Irvine (blackjack player) (born 1970), engineer and professional blackjack player
David Irvine (Canadian politician) (1835–1924), Irish-born farmer and political figure in New Brunswick, Canada
David Irvine (diplomat) (1947–2022), Director-General of ASIO

See also
David Ervine (1953–2007), Northern Irish unionist politician
David Irving (disambiguation)
David Irwin (disambiguation)